Connell may refer to:

Places 
Connell (barony), County Kildare, Ireland
Great Connell Priory, a historic former house
Connell, Washington, United States

Other uses
Connell (surname), including a list of people with the name

See also 
Connelly (disambiguation)
O'Connell (disambiguation)